Back In Time is a backup application for Linux. It has versions that integrate favorably in GNOME and KDE SC 4 and is available directly from the repositories of many Linux distributions. Released under the terms of the GNU General Public License (GPL), it is free software.

Back In Time uses rsync as backend and has the characteristic feature of using hard links for files which are identical in snapshots at different times, thus using disk space just once for files that remained unchanged. It is possible to use several backup profiles, e.g. for backups on different hard disks and also to create schedules. Symbolic links can be backed up, both absolute and relative ones, but hard links cannot be treated as such due to the used backup method. Back In Time also supports encryption of backups and backup over SSH.

Advantages of the hard link method are that it is easy to look at snapshots of the system at different times and also easy to remove old snapshots compared to incremental backup methods which save difference information between consecutive backup times. However, a drawback of Back In Time is that it does not allow for compression, and requires file systems that support hard links on the backup location.

User interface 
There is a graphical interface written in Qt.

See also
The standard backup tool of Mac OS X, Time Machine, works on the same principles.

References

Back In Time – A Simple backup tool for ubuntu

External links 
 Back In Time code hosting

Free backup software
Backup software for Linux
Software that uses Qt
Linux-only free software